INCEIF UNIVERSITY was set up by Bank Negara Malaysia (Central Bank of Malaysia) in 2005 to develop human capital for the global Islamic finance industry. Commonly known as INCEIF – The Global University of Islamic Finance, it is the only university in the world dedicated to Islamic finance. INCEIF is part of Malaysia's initiative to promote education in Islamic finance for the domestic and international finance community.

In August 2007, the Ministry of Higher Education Malaysia accorded INCEIF with the university status. In February 2009, Bank Negara Malaysia Governor Tan Sri Dato' Sri Dr. Zeti Akhtar Aziz was officially proclaimed as the first Chancellor for INCEIF. The proclamation is in accordance with the constitution of INCEIF where Tan Sri Dr Zeti Akhtar, as the Chairman of INCEIF's Board of Directors, assumes the position of Chancellor. The proclamations were made during the first convocation in 2009 where INCEIF admitted its first batch of graduates, who completed the flagship programme Chartered Islamic Finance Professional (CIFP).

Apart from its academic programmes, which are CIFP, Masters in Islamic Finance Practice (MIFP), MSc in Islamic Finance and PhD in Islamic Finance, INCEIF also undertakes customised executive education programmes and industry-focused applied research. The curriculum at INCEIF is structured with inputs from Shariah scholars and industry players to bridge the gap between academic knowledge and industry experience. Its faculty members provide INCEIF students with mentoring relationships and opportunities for professional development. INCEIF is governed by a Governing Council. Supporting the Governing Council is the Professional Development Panel whose role is to set performance standards to ensure a high quality of programme content and the Executive Committee.

Academic Programmes

INCEIF offers the following programmes:
Chartered Islamic Financial Professional (CIFP) - a postgraduate qualification aimed at producing professionals with knowledge, analytical tools and perspectives in Islamic finance. 
Professional Certificate in Islamic Finance (PCIF) - a certification to qualify an Islamic Finance practitioner, which can be done sitting from anywhere in the world. 
Executive Masters in Islamic Finance (EMIF) - a postgraduate programme aimed at producing industry practitioners with global insight, analytical tools and holistic knowledge in Islamic Finance, which can be done sitting from anywhere in the world. 
The Masters in Islamic Finance Practice (MIFP) - a postgraduate programme aimed at producing industry practitioners with global insight and holistic knowledge in Islamic Finance. 
The MSc in Islamic Finance – a programme addressing key areas of Islamic economics, finance and Shariah from both the theoretical and applied aspects. 
Doctor of Philosophy in Islamic Finance – an industry-driven programme concerning Islamic and conventional finance.

Key Partnerships (As at January 2014)

Malaysia
Universiti Tun Abdul Razak (UNIRAZAK)
Universiti Sultan Zainal Abidin (UNISZA)
BNP Paribas
Prudential BSN Takaful Berhad
OCBC Al-Amin
Hay Group

International
Islamic Financial Services Board
Islamic Development Bank
World Bank
University of Reading (UK)
University of East London (UK)
Kuwait Finance Research Ltd (Kuwait)
Capital Market Licensing & Training Agency (Turkey)
Capital Market Board of Turkey (Turkey)
Istanbul Sehir University (Turkey)
University International of Rabat (Morocco)
CESAG (Senegal)
Kenya School of Monetary Studies (Kenya)
College of Banking and Financial Studies (Oman)

References

External links
WDIBF Website
INCEIF Website
Islamic banking and Takaful chapter of the Malaysian Financial Sector Masterplan
Official website of the Islamic Financial Services Board
Official website of the International Shari'ah Research Academy for Islamic Finance
Turin Islamic Economic Forum

Islamic economic jurisprudence
Islamic economics
Universities and colleges in Kuala Lumpur
Islamic universities and colleges in Malaysia
Educational institutions established in 2005
2005 establishments in Malaysia
Central Bank of Malaysia
Private universities and colleges in Malaysia